The 2022–23 UMass Minutemen ice hockey season is the 91st season of play for the program. They will represent the University of Massachusetts Amherst in the 2022–23 NCAA Division I men's ice hockey season and for the 28th season in the Hockey East conference. They are coached by Greg Carvel, in his sixth season, and play their home games at Mullins Center.

Season
In the offseason, Garrett Wait suffered a potentially career-ending knee injury during a workout. He was medically disqualified from playing during the 2022–23 season.

Departures

Recruiting

Roster
As of August 6, 2022.

Standings

Schedule and results

|-
!colspan=12 style=";" | Exhibition

|-
!colspan=12 style=";" | Regular Season

|-
!colspan=12 style=";" | 

|-
!colspan=12 style=";" | 

|-
!colspan=12 style=";" | Regular Season

|-
!colspan=12 style=";" |

Scoring statistics

Goaltending statistics

Rankings

USCHO did not release a poll in weeks 1 and 13.

References

2022-23
UMass
UMass
UMass
UMass